Fournierella massiliensis is a bacterium of the monotypic genus Fournierella in the family Oscillospiraceae.

References

Bacteria described in 2017
Oscillospiraceae